The Jamestown Verrazzano Bridge spans the West Passage of Narragansett Bay in Rhode Island, United States. It is part of Rhode Island Route 138 and is on the route to Newport, Rhode Island for traffic heading northbound from Interstate 95.

Construction and design
The bridge is named for Italian explorer Giovanni da Verrazzano. Construction began in 1985 and was completed in 1992, originally consisting of two undivided lanes and built alongside the Jamestown Bridge which had served the same route since 1940. The older bridge was demolished in April 2006.

It is a post-tensioned, double-cell concrete box girder bridge with four travel lanes separated by a concrete Jersey barrier. It has a walkway on the north side, but it is not accessible to the public .

The bridge was listed as structurally deficient in 2007, despite being only 15 years old at the time, due to small cracks found in some of the box girder segments. The cracks were repaired in 2008.

References

External links

 Steve Anderson's Bostonroads.com: Jamestown-Verrazano Bridge (RI 138)
 Inspection and Maintenance of the bridge
 Bridge history

Road bridges in Rhode Island
Narragansett Bay
Bridges in Newport County, Rhode Island
Bridges in Washington County, Rhode Island
Box girder bridges in the United States
Concrete bridges in the United States
Buildings and structures in Jamestown, Rhode Island
Buildings and structures in North Kingstown, Rhode Island
Bridges completed in 1992
1992 establishments in Rhode Island